The gannet is a seabird. It may also refer to:


Geography
 Gannet Island (Western Australia)
 Gannet Islands,, Labrador, Canada - see Gannet Islands Ecological Reserve
 Kārewa / Gannet Island, New Zealand
 Gannet Rock, New Zealand
 Gannet Lake, Georgia, United States

Aircraft
 Colyaer Gannet S100, a Spanish flying boat
 Fairey Gannet, a British Cold-War era naval aircraft
 Gloster Gannet, a British pre-Second World War aircraft
 Grumman Gannet, the original name for the British Fleet Air Arm version of the Grumman Hellcat fighter
 Tugan Gannet, a small, twin-engine airliner built in Australia in the 1930s

Ships
 , nine Royal Navy ships and two shore establishments
 , a minesweeper laid down in 1918
 , a minesweeper laid down in 1959

Other uses
 Gannet oil and gas field, North Sea

See also
Gannett (disambiguation)